Treneglos is a hamlet and a civil parish in north-east Cornwall, England, United Kingdom. It is in the Registration District of Launceston.

Treneglos is described as a hamlet "where the old Cornish "trev" [settlement] is no more than a triangular green beside a church and two or three houses". It is above a wooded valley, a choice place where ancient Celtic tribes sought shelter. Nearby, at Wilsey Down, is evidence of prehistoric tumulus. Now, it is not unusual to see sheep wandering along the country roads.

History
Treneglos, from "tre-an-eglos", means church, a particularly strong, solid church, or church town. The parish of Treneglos included Wilsey Down, on which were "four or five ancient barrows or tumuli".

Tregulland Burrow

From an abstract of the journal article The Excavation of Tregulland Burrow, Treneglos Parish, Cornwall, Paul Ashbee's findings at the prehistoric Treneglos barrow are described as:
The ruined and gutted barrow called Tregulland Burrow, when totally excavated, proved to have had a complex structure. Stake holes denoting withdrawn stakes, an infilled 'ritual' pit, a satellite grave containing a cremation and arrowheads, and most probably the central grave pit, were the features of the first phase of its construction. A cairn-ring, with a buttressing bank, the soil for which was dug from an encircling ditch, and its turf covering, comprised the second. A great slab bearing cup-marks and an 'eyebrow' motif, also other lesser cup-marked and ornamented slabs, were incorporated in cairn-ring and bank. Cup-marked stones recovered from the disturbed central area suggested the one-time existence of a stone-built grave incorporating such elements. After this second phase the barrow centre was open and arena-like, and a food vessel and a cremation were put in close by the cairn-ring. All was finally enveloped by material from the depths of the ditch. Poorly built walling or turves retained the final mound.Mr Rich Bradley. Rock Art and the Prehistory of Atlantic Europe: Signing the Land. Psychology Press; 20 August 1997 [cited 16 September 2012]. . p. 146–.

St Gregory's Church

The parish was in the 12th century in the possession of Robert Fitz-William, Lord of Downinney (also Downeckney), who gave it to the priory of Tywardreath. Warbstow was then a chapelry dependent on Treneglos; the two benefices were later combined as a vicarage (united benefice). Robert was responsible for building the church.

The church was enlarged in the 15th or 16th centuries to include a moulded basket arch added to the north door, the addition of a north aisle with Perpendicular tracery and, near the east end, a rood loft stair turret. In the 16th century the south porch was added; this has an arch to the south door over which is a Norman tympanum. The Norman tympanum and font were perhaps by the same craftsman as those at Egloskerry and Tremaine. The sculptured Norman tympanum, similar to other works in nearby churches, is described as "a conventional tree in the centre, with a pair of beasts having their tails bent round between the legs, and upwards across their bodies, placed symmetrically facing each other." The meaning may be found in the Psalms verse about the vine of Egypt: "The boughs thereof were like goodly cedars... The boar of the wood doth waste it, and the wild beast of the field doth devour it."<ref>Cambrian Archaeological Association. Archaeologia Cambrensis: the journal of the Cambrian Archoeological Association]. published for the Association by J. R. Smith; 1896 [cited 16 September 2012. pp. 161–162. Note: drawn image on page 161.</ref>

During the 17th century, adherents of Roman Catholicism became very scarce in Cornwall; the religious census of 1671 recorded recusants in the parish of Treneglos and four others. The Reverend J. H. Mason was the vicar in the early 19th century; he was appointed in 1804 by the Prince of Wales (who later became king as George IV).

The church, rebuilt in 1858, is dedicated to St George and St Gregory. The church consists of a nave, chancel and north aisle. Four four-centred arches on granite pillars make up the arcade. The original tympanum and font were preserved. In 1871 the tower was being rebuilt. By 1872 the Warbstow and Treneglos parishes made one benefice. The Duke of Cornwall was the patron of the vicarage, with its 31-acre glebe. In 1960 it was listed as a Grade II building.

Historic farmhouse
A historic stone farmhouse, a Grade II listed building, was built in the late 16th century or early 17th century. It was probably originally a 2-room or more house that was later remodelled and enlarged in the 19th century. It has a slate roof and the rear doorway has a granite arch from the 17th century. There are other British Listed Buildings in Treneglos.

19th century
In the 19th century Treneglos was in the deanery of Trigg Major and was part of Lesnewth Hundred. The parish of Treneglos was reported to be 2362 statute acres by 1838. The population between 1801 and 1831 ranged from a low of 183 people (1831) to 238 people (1821).Joseph Polsue, ed. A Complete Parochial History of the County of Cornwall [ed. by J. Polsue].. 1872 [cited 16 September 2012]. p. 241.

19th century Methodist Church
The stone United Methodist Church was completed in 1881. It is a single-storied chapel with a rectangular floor plan, window arches, a triple lancet window, porch and a gabled, slate roof. It was listed as a Grade II building on 11 January 1989. The single storied Sunday school building may have been used for worship before the church's completion in 1881.

Geology
Dr Henry Samuel Boase wrote in Davies Gilbert's The Parochial History of Cornwall (1838) that the geology in the southern part of Treneglos is felspathic rock and is otherwise calcareous (mostly or partly composed of calcium carbonate) rock.

Geography
The civil parish is bounded to the north by Warbstow parish, to the east by Tremaine and Tresmeer parishes, and to the west by Davidstow parish. The population of Treneglos parish in the 2001 census was 101.

The hamlet of Treneglos is situated 2 miles (3 km) east of Hallworthy, a hamlet at a crossroads on the western edge of the parish. The plantation on Wilsey Down (919 ft) lies between the two hamlets and the parish church of St Gregory is at Treneglos. The North Cornwall Railway from Launceston to Padstow had stations at Tresmeer and Otterham Station; the line between them ran through the parish of Treneglos. This part of the railway line was opened on 14 August 1893 and closed on 3 October 1966.

Gallery

See also

 Bodmin Moor
 Christianity in Cornwall

Notes

References

Further reading
 Cornwall Family History Society. Treneglos. Cornwall Family History Society; 1 December 2000. .
 Cornwall Family History Society. Cornwall 1861 Census: An Index of Entries for the Parish of Treneglos. Cornwall Family History Society; 1 September 2000. .
 Gillian Anne Thompson. Parish of Treneglos: 1813–37 Marriage Transcripts. Cornwall Family History Society; February 1994. .
 Joseph Polsue; Cornwall County Library. Lake's parochial history of the county of Cornwall''. EP Publishing [for] Cornwall County Library; 1 January 1974. .

External links

 Treneglos information and images
 Treneglos page on Genuki
 St Gregory Church site
 St Gregory Church images
 The parish church of St Gregory is at Treneglos  
 Listed Buildings in Treneglos, Cornwall, England
 Trescar, Bed and Breakfast in Treneglos

Civil parishes in Cornwall
Villages in Cornwall